This article lists proposed canals, that have not yet been built.

List of canals
 The Eurasia Canal, proposing to connect the Caspian Sea to the Black Sea
 The Istanbul Canal, which would connect the Black and Aegean seas
 The Thai Canal, which would cut across the Kra Isthmus
 The Nicaragua Canal, alternative of Panama canal
 The Salwa Canal, a proposed Saudi shipping and tourism canal along the border with Qatar
 The Northern river reversal in the Soviet Union
 The Sulawesi Canal, which would connect the Gulf of Tomini with the Makassar Strait.

References

Water transport infrastructure
Proposed canals
Canals